Metz is a city in the northeast of France at the confluence of the Moselle and the Seille rivers.

Metz may also refer to:

Places

United States
Metz, California
Metz, Indiana
Metz, Missouri
Metz, West Virginia
Metz, Wisconsin
Metz Township, Michigan

Australia
Metz, a former mining town now part of Hillgrove, New South Wales

France
Metz-le-Comte
Metz-en-Couture
Metz-Robert
Metz-Tessy
Pont-de-Metz

Companies and businesses
Metz & Co, an exclusive department store in Amsterdam, The Netherlands
Metz (company), German electronics and photographic equipment maker
Metz Company, American manufacturer of early automobiles
Metz et Cie, steel company in Luxembourg that was incorporated into ARBED in 1911
Metz Brewery, first brewery in the U.S. state of Nebraska
Metz (drink), a discontinued schnapps-based alcopop by Bacardi

Other uses
Metz (surname)
Metz family, a prominent historical political family in Luxembourg
Metz Cathedral in Metz, France
Diocese of Metz in Metz, France
Metz Congress, 1979 meeting of the French Socialist Party 
FC Metz, or Football Club de Metz, a French football (soccer) team
Metzenbaum scissors
Metz (band), Canadian punk band
 Metz (album), a 2012 album by the band
 Metz, one half of the British Asian rap duo Metz N Trix

See also
Kronmetz, German name of the Italian city Mezzocorona 
Wällisch Metz, German name of the Italian city Mezzolombardo
Deutsch Metz, German name of the Italian city Mezzotedesco
 Mez (disambiguation)